Aaron, Son of the Devil is the name given to an antisemitic caricature of an English Jew appearing on an Essex county document dated 1277. The document concerns fines imposed on some Jews and Christians who had pursued a doe after it had escaped from hounds chasing it near the city of Colchester, an offence against the forest laws of the time. One Jew, however, had supposedly evaded arrest and became the subject of the caricature.

The caricature is the earliest dated portrait of a Jew in England. He wears a yellow badge (with the Tablets of the Law) on his upper garments.

References 

 Joseph Jacobs, Jewish Ideals and Other Essays, Macmillan, 1896 (pp. 229–233)
 Walter Rye, History of Norfolk, 1887 (p. 52)
 J. Richard Green, A Short History of the English People, 1892, Illustrated edition (i.393)

1277 works
1277 in England
Antisemitism in England
Antisemitic works
Caricature
13th-century English Jews
History of Colchester